Schirrmacher is a surname. Notable people with the surname include:

Frank Schirrmacher (1959–2014), German journalist and co-editor of the Frankfurter Allgemeine Zeitung
Friedrich Wilhelm Schirrmacher (1824–1904), German historian
Thomas Schirrmacher (born 1960), German theologian